Jalebiyan is a Pakistani comedy sitcom airing on Geo TV written by Asad Bukhari, directed by Danish Nawaz and produced by Evolution Media Productions.

Plot outline 
It is a story of a family of Tafangam who have 2 wives and his life runs like a storm between two wives. The first wife Noor jahan was his mother's choice. She is a village girl who is illiterate but fond of Urdu literature poetries and add her own lines in the poetry. On the other hand, the second wife his choice by love "Sumaira". She is a working lady with model looks and an expert on English language which provokes Tafangam to respond and use his unbearable foreign linguistic skills. Life was good while both the wives were unaware of each other's existence, but good luck is like a short-term investment plan, and Mr. Tafangam finds himself in a tough spot when Noor Jahaan drops in to his city apartment from nowhere. Now Tafangam is in a position where he can't disclose to Sumaira that Noor Jahaan is his first wife who knows the truth about Sumaira. The story revolves around Tafangam, Noor Jahaan and Sumaira with an occasional guest appearance of a new character.

Cast 
 Mehmood Aslam as Tafangam
 Maria Wasti as Noor Jahaan
 Zainab Qayyum as Sumaira
 Faisal Qureshi (special appearance)

References

External links 
 Jalebiyan on Geo TV

Geo TV original programming
Urdu-language television shows